Richard Lee Strout (March 14, 1898 – August 19, 1990) was an American journalist and commentator. He was national correspondent for the Christian Science Monitor from 1923 and he wrote the "TRB from Washington" column for The New Republic from 1943 to 1983; he collected the best of his columns in TRB: Views and Perspectives on the Presidency (New York: Macmillan, 1979), a book notable for showing that Strout was one of the first observers of the American presidency to express worry about what later scholars and journalists came to call the imperial presidency.

Life
Richard Lee Strout was born in Cohoes, New York, on March 14, 1898, and was raised in Brooklyn. He graduated from Harvard University in 1919. Afterwards, he moved to England to work in journalism in 1919 before returning to the United States in 1921, and held various newspaper positions for several years before beginning an association with The Christian Science Monitor that was to last until his retirement in 1984. He received a master's degree in economics from Harvard in 1923. He won the George Polk Memorial Award for national reporting in 1958 and a special Pulitzer Prize for Journalism in 1978. The Special Award cited "distinguished commentary from Washington over many years as staff correspondent for The Christian Science Monitor and contributor to The New Republic." In 1973, Strout received the Golden Plate Award of the American Academy of Achievement.

Strout was a Washington resident at age 92, when he died there on August 19, 1990, eleven days after hospitalization following a fall.

References

Other sources
New General Catalog of Old Books and Authors
Richard Strout Library of Congress Papers Collection
Biographical Dictionary of American Newspaper Columnists - (Google Books)

External links
 Oral history interview with Richard Strout at the Truman Library 
 

American male journalists
20th-century American journalists
Pulitzer Prize winners for journalism
Harvard University alumni
Writers from New York (state)
1898 births
1990 deaths
The Christian Science Monitor people